Shahrdari Dezful Football Club is an Iranian football club based in Dezful, Iran.

They competed in the 2010–11 Iran Football's 3rd Division, but could not advance to the second round. They finally got the 7th place of Group 6.

However, in 2011–12 Iranian football pre-season, they replaced by the club Foolad Natanz in 2011–12 Iran Football's 2nd Division.

They currently compete in the 3rd Division.

Season-by-Season

The table below shows the achievements of the club in various competitions.

References

Notes
 The club official website
 The club fans website

See also
 Hazfi Cup
 2011–12 Iran Football's 2nd Division

Football clubs in Iran
Association football clubs established in 2005
2005 establishments in Iran